Marc Delafontaine (March 31, 1837/1838, Céligny, Switzerland–1911) was a Swiss chemist and spectroscopist who was involved in discovering and investigating some of the rare earth elements.

Career
Delafontaine studied with Jean Charles Galissard de Marignac at the University of Geneva. He also worked at the University of Geneva.  

Delafontaine moved to the United States of America, arriving in New York in 1870, and later becoming a naturalized citizen. 
He taught in Chicago, Illinois at city high schools, and at a women's college.
He also worked as analytical chemist with the
Chicago Police Department.

Research

Holmium
In 1878, along with Jacques-Louis Soret, Delafontaine first observed holmium spectroscopically. In 1879, Per Teodor Cleve chemically separated it from thulium and erbium. All three men are given credit for the element's discovery.

Yttrium, terbium and erbium
In 1843 Carl Gustaf Mosander discovered terbium and erbium as components of yttria.

However, this discovery was hotly contested.  Spectroscopist Nils Johan Berlin denied that the two elements existed, failing to confirm the existence of "erbia" and suggesting that its name be applied to "terbia".  

In 1864, Marc Delafontaine used optical spectroscopy to conclusively prove that yttrium, terbium and erbium were separate elements. Ironically, however, the confusion that had been introduced between the names continued. Mosander's proposed names were switched, giving the amethyst compound the name "erbium" oxide and the yellow substance the name "terbium" oxide, instead of the other way around as originally proposed.

References

Notes

Swiss chemists
1837 births
1911 deaths
Discoverers of chemical elements
19th-century Swiss people
19th-century chemists
20th-century Swiss people
20th-century chemists
Holmium
Rare earth scientists